Telsang is a village in the southern state of Karnataka, India. It is located in the Athni taluk of Belgaum district in Karnataka.There are two freedom fighters from here, one is Shri Dhanavant Rayappa Halingali and another is Shri Baburao Hujare who was the first MLA in Bombay state before Karnataka Yekikarana.

Temples
In Telsang, there are several temples, such as Venkateshwar Temple, Ellamma Temple, Sri Mallikarjuna and Basavanna Temple, Vithoba Temple, Shankarlinga Temple, Hanuman Temple and more in this village five great Matha Hirematha, Virakta matha, Sidramappan Matha Andani Matha and Horatti Matha.

On every last Monday of shravana masa, all village people gather and worship this god. This temple is surrounded by many trees.

Now recently the renovation of Sri Mallikarjuna and Basavanna Temple present at the village center is done by the village people.

Every year the priest of Sri Mallikarjuna Temple will carry the Kambi (the wooden statue of god) to Srisailam (the holy place in Hyderabad) by foot. In Srisailam the priest performs the pooja of kumbi near the Krishna River (Patal Ganga) and then returns to Telsang. Just after arrival of the kambi in Telsang all village people celebrate the festival called "Mallayyana Aideshi" by singing and chanting the songs of lord Sri Mallikarjuna for 5 days.

People also celebrate a festival called Ellammana Jathra for the goddess Ellamma on Gouri Hunnime every year. A big crowd will be gathered on this occasion to celebrate the Jathra for three days.
Same day on Giurihunnime Rotti families are celebrating Gouri pooja for 5 days.
 .

Demographics
, Telsang had a population of 8,407 with 4,295 males and 4,112 females.

See also
 Belgaum
 Districts of Karnataka

References

2.With reference from Shri. Dhanavant Rayappa Halingali

External links
 Official Website of Belguam District, Karnataka

Villages in Belagavi district